Erode taluk is a taluk of Erode district of the Indian state of Tamil Nadu. The headquarters of the taluk is the town of Erode. In 2016, Erode Taluk has been trifurcated into Erode, Modakurichi and Kodumudi. It falls under Erode Revenue Division.

Demographics
According to the 2011 census, the taluk of Erode had a population of 820,720 with 410,323 males and 410,397 females. There were 1,000 women for every 1,000 men. The taluk had a literacy rate of 73.5%. Child population in the age group below 6 years were 35,016 Males and 33,498 Females.
After trifurcation of the taluk, the present Erode taluk will have a population of ~558,074.

Populated places
 Erode Municipal Corporation
 Chittode
 Nasiyanur

References

External links
 https://web.archive.org/web/20180330160655/http://www.erode.tn.nic.in/taluk.htm

Taluks of Erode district